The Phuket Zoo is a zoo located in Phuket, Thailand. It was founded as a private zoo in 1997 and currently remains private. The zoo is located near the Muang District and the Phuket Bay. The zoo has been embroiled in controversy over its lack of animal welfare standards and allegations of extreme cruelty to animals.

It is known for having close encounters with many exotic animals including tigers, monkeys and elephants. The zoo has many sections including areas devoted to crocodiles, elephants and monkeys while also having an aquarium and an orchard garden.

Animal shows

Monkey shows
The monkey show consists of a macaque monkey doing tricks and then taking pictures with the crowd. Some of the monkey's tricks include riding a bike, dunking a basketball and doing exercises, like push-ups and sit-ups. After that, the monkey will walk around with an oil-paper umbrella and take pictures with guests.

Elephant shows

In the elephant shows, a group of asian elephants perform tricks and have an opportunity to meet the guests. The elephants start off by doing tricks like kicking a soccer ball and will also do dances and races. At times, the guests will be able to feed the elephants bananas and at the end touch their trunks. The elephants have even be trained to ask for tips. Many of these shows are demeaning to the animals involved, and some say the zoo should be shut down entirely.
The elephants the zoo has were formerly logging elephants. Currently, the Zoo faces allegations of animal abuse due to their treatment of their captive elephants.

Crocodile shows
While there are no encounters guests can have with the crocodiles, many guests find the show very entertaining. The highlight is when one of the trainers sticks his head in between the crocodiles mouth.

Exhibits

Aquarium
The zoo has a small aquarium with a variety of fish and marine animals including fresh-water and salt-water fish, turtles, frogs, crabs and lizards. They also have a display area showing fishing equipment and techniques of Thailand's fisherman as well as seashells.

Bird Park
The Phuket's Zoo Bird Park has a variety of birds including toucans, peacocks, parrots, hawks, emus and ostriches. Some of the birds are allowed to fly freely in the park. For some reason there's a civet cat

Animal encounters
As well as the opportunities to meet the animals during the shows, the Phuket Zoo also allows guests to meet some of their other animals. Some of those opportunities include getting to take pictures and pet a tiger. Formerly, you could take pictures and touch an orangutan, but she was later confiscated by the police. The experiences cost an extra fee.

Conservation efforts by the zoo
It does not appear that the Phuket Zoo is involved with conservation efforts to save animals worldwide. They are also not accredited by the South East Asian Zoos Association (which is the main coordinating body for zoos in Thailand) or the World Association of Zoos and Aquariums.

Milo the Orangutan
The Phuket Zoo formerly had an orangutan named, Milo. However, a petition garnished over 10,000 signatures for her to be removed due to her being forced to take photos and her health struggles. Due to the petition, the Natural Resources and Environmental Crime Division of the Royal Thai Police and Department of National Parks decided to confiscate her after it appeared she was being kept illegally.

When the authorities came to confiscate Milo, she was not at the zoo. All pictures of her on the zoo's website were also deleted. Later in the week, Milo was found in a small cage in the jungle.

Milo later died the following year of a stroke. Her bad health from her time at the zoo most likely contributed to her passing.

Controversy
While many guests enjoy their time at the Phuket Zoo, many people find the zoo to be cruel and inhumane.

Disappearance of animals
Some guests have complained that animals at the zoo including snow leopards and camels disappeared without any word from the zoo. Some people have speculated that the animals may have gotten sick and were sold off before they died.

Monkeys
The macaque monkey used in the monkey shows have a rope around their neck and are forced to do tricks. One exhibit holds two monkeys, but one is more aggressive than the other forcing it to become malnourished. One gibbon is even in a staff-member's arms all day and stays in a cage with a lock  at night with no room to move.

Elephants
In 2019, a 2-year-old elephant died from injuries he sustained after performing for tourists.

Crocodiles
The crocodile exhibit is highly criticized for being overcrowded, small and dirty. Many people have said the water the crocodiles have is too shallow and is filled with feces. They have also been caught on video being poked at with brooms.

Turtle
A video of a turtle at the Phuket Zoo's Aquarium sparked controversy as its exhibit seemed to be too small for it to move.

Bird Park
Some of the birds in the Bird Park are chained up and some guests  have said the bird's cages are too small and overcrowded.

Drugging of animals
Due to the fact many animals have encounters with humans, many guests speculate that the animals are drugged so they don't attack humans.

Inadequate exhibits
Many of the animal's exhibits, including the ostrich and deer, have no grass, shrubbery or enrichment toys. Even one of the Asiatic black bear's enclosure was just a concrete pit.

Efforts to change or close the Phuket Zoo
PETA has called on the zoo to "Improve the Living Conditions of the Animals..."
There are also plenty of petitions online including one on change.org that call for the closing of the Phuket Zoo.

Animal list

 Crocodile
 Asian Elephant
 Sumatran Tiger
 Toucan
 Hawk
 Ostrich
 Emu
 Asiatic black bear
 White-tailed deer
 Turtle
 Fish
 Crabs
 Macaque monkey
 Gibbon
 Parrot
 Frog
 Lizard
 Peacock
 Snakes
 Otters

References

Zoos in Thailand
Tourist attractions in Phuket province